Cymothoe owassae is a butterfly in the family Nymphalidae. It is found on Bioko an island off the west coast of Africa.

References

Butterflies described in 1916
Cymothoe (butterfly)
Endemic fauna of Equatorial Guinea
Butterflies of Africa